A Million Words, a Million Dollars is the second studio album by American rapper Lunasicc. It was released June 2, 1998, on AWOL Records and distributed by Noo Trybe Records. The album features production from Killa Tay, DJ Daryl and One Drop Scott. It peaked at number 88 on the Billboard Top R&B/Hip-Hop Albums chart.

Track listing

Chart history

References

External links 
 A Million Words, a Million Dollars at Discogs
 A Million Words, a Million Dollars at MusicBrainz
 A Million Words, a Million Dollars at Tower Records

Luni Coleone albums
1998 albums